The 1977 New York Mets season was the 16th regular season for the Mets, who played home games at Shea Stadium. Initially led by manager Joe Frazier followed by Joe Torre, the team posted a 64–98 record and finished in last place for the first time since 1967, and for the first time since divisional play was introduced in 1969.

Offseason
 March 30, 1977: Benny Ayala was traded by the Mets to the St. Louis Cardinals for Doug Clarey.

Regular season 
The 1977 Mets had some promising new players in outfielder Lee Mazzilli and catcher John Stearns, but there was not enough stock in the lineup. The once powerful pitching staff had also taken on a leaner look. By midseason, ace Tom Seaver had been traded, Jerry Koosman was 8–20 and Jon Matlack (who would be traded in December) was 7–15.

Managerial change 
On May 30, after being swept in a doubleheader by the Montreal Expos, the Mets' record fell to 15–30, and Frazier was fired as manager of the Mets. Mets first baseman Joe Torre assumed the role of player-manager, leading his team to a 49–68 record the remainder of the way. The team finished 37 games behind the Philadelphia Phillies in the National League East, narrowly avoiding a 100-loss season (64–98).

Torre was the club's sixth manager and in certain respects his appointment reestablished the New York connection of Mets managers. Although he had spent most of his career with the Milwaukee and Atlanta Braves and the St. Louis Cardinals, Torre had grown up and played his first baseball in Brooklyn. When the thirty-six-year-old Torre retired as a player that June, he left behind a .297 lifetime batting average for his eighteen years in the major leagues, including an MVP season in 1971 when he led the league with a .363 batting average. Torre was an able manager, with a veteran's incisive insights into the game and the ability to handle and motivate players. But in this case, a last-place team was a last-place team no matter how able the manager.

"The Midnight Massacre" 
Seaver was at odds with Met chairman M. Donald Grant all season due to contract disputes. The conflict came to a head two weeks after Torre took over as manager on June 15, when Grant traded Seaver to the Cincinnati Reds for Pat Zachry, Doug Flynn, Steve Henderson and Dan Norman. Dave Kingman was also traded to the San Diego Padres for minor league pitcher Paul Siebert and Bobby Valentine. Somewhat more quietly that day, they also acquired Joel Youngblood from the St. Louis Cardinals for Mike Phillips. To make room for Youngblood on the Mets' active roster, Torre retired as a player.

From a public-relations perspective, the Seaver and Kingman trades were a disaster.  Seaver especially was a hard hit to the fan base. As a member of the 1969 World Champions, he was a symbol of past glory, and was still a highly-effective pitcher. Whatever else they might not have had, they still had as their very own the man generally acclaimed as baseball's premier pitcher. No matter how abrasive the relationship between Seaver and his employers had become, dealing him away was a serious miscalculation, and Shea Stadium became known as "Grant's Tomb" in the New York sports pages.

Grant did acquire some good, young talent for Seaver; Flynn was a slick fielding second baseman who won the NL Gold Glove award in 1980, Zachry was co-winner of the NL Rookie of the Year award with Butch Metzger the previous season (coincidentally, they would be teammates on the Mets in 1978), and Henderson would be narrowly eclipsed by the Montreal Expos' Andre Dawson for the award in 1977.

Dave Kingman was in the final year of his contract, and thus, would have become a free agent at the end of the season unless the club re-signed him, but coming on top of the Seaver trade, aligned with the fact that the team got very little in return for their big buster, the Kingman trade only added to the growing disenchantment at Shea Stadium, and June 15, 1977, would forever be known to Mets fans as "The Midnight Massacre."

Season highlights 
May 31 - June 16 - In his first 17 games as manager, Joe Torre's Mets went 12–5, a great start that was compared to the Mets  championship run.
June 7 - Tom Seaver struck out ten Cincinnati Reds in an 8–0 Mets win. It'll be the last time Seaver struck out 10 or more batters in a Mets uniform.
July 13 - The Mets trailed the Chicago Cubs 2–1 with one out in the sixth inning when the lights at Shea went out as New York City was stricken with a blackout that would last two days. The game was resumed on September 16, with the Cubs winning 5–2. On July 15, when the lights finally went on in New York, the Mets split a double header with the Pittsburgh Pirates.
August 21 - Tom Seaver took the mound against the New York Mets for the first time in his career. His Cincinnati Reds defeated the Mets 5–1.

Season standings

Record vs. opponents

Notable transactions 
 June 7, 1977: Bud Black was drafted by the Mets in the 2nd round of the secondary phase of the 1977 Major League Baseball draft, but did not sign.
 June 14, 1977: Jeff Reardon was signed by the Mets as an amateur free agent.
 June 15, 1977: Tom Seaver was traded by the Mets to the Cincinnati Reds for Pat Zachry, Doug Flynn, Steve Henderson, and Dan Norman.
 June 15, 1977: Mike Phillips was traded by the Mets to the St. Louis Cardinals for Joel Youngblood.
 June 15, 1977: Dave Kingman was traded by the Mets to the San Diego Padres for Bobby Valentine and Paul Siebert.

Roster

Player stats

Batting

Starters by position 
Note: Pos = Position; G = Games played; AB = At bats; H = Hits; Avg. = Batting average; HR = Home runs; RBI = Runs batted in

Other batters 
Note: G = Games played; AB = At bats; H = Hits; Avg. = Batting average; HR = Home runs; RBI = Runs batted in

Pitching

Starting pitchers 
Note: G = Games pitched; IP = Innings pitched; W = Wins; L = Losses; ERA = Earned run average; SO = Strikeouts

Other pitchers 
Note: G = Games pitched; IP = Innings pitched; W = Wins; L = Losses; ERA = Earned run average; SO = Strikeouts

Relief pitchers 
Note: G = Games pitched; W = Wins; L = Losses; SV = Saves; ERA = Earned run average; SO = Strikeouts

Farm system

Notes

References

External links
The New York Mets, The Official 25th Anniversary Book, Donald Honig, 1986
1977 New York Mets at Baseball Reference
1977 New York Mets at Baseball Almanac

New York Mets seasons
New York Mets season
New York
1970s in Queens